Cathepsin C (CTSC) also known as dipeptidyl peptidase I (DPP-I) is a lysosomal exo-cysteine protease belonging to the peptidase C1 protein family, a subgroup of the cysteine cathepsins. In humans, it is encoded by the CTSC gene.

Function 

Cathepsin C appears to be a central coordinator for activation of many serine proteases in immune/inflammatory cells.

Cathepsin C catalyses excision of dipeptides from the N-terminus of protein and peptide substrates, except if (i) the amino group of the N-terminus is blocked, (ii) the site of cleavage is on either side of a proline residue, (iii) the N-terminal residue is lysine or arginine, or (iv) the structure of the peptide or protein prevents further digestion from the N-terminus.

Structure 

The cDNAs encoding rat, human, murine, bovine, dog and two Schistosome cathepsin Cs have been cloned and sequenced and show that the enzyme is highly conserved. The human and rat cathepsin C cDNAs encode precursors (prepro-cathepsin C) comprising signal peptides of 24 residues, pro-regions of 205 (rat cathepsin C) or 206 (human cathepsin C) residues and catalytic domains of 233 residues which contain the catalytic residues and are 30-40% identical to the mature amino acid sequences of papain and a number of other cathepsins including cathepsins, B, H, K, L, and S.

The translated prepro-cathepsin C is processed into the mature form by at least four cleavages of the polypeptide chain. The signal peptide is removed during translocation or secretion of the pro-enzyme (pro-cathepsin C) and a large N-terminal proregion fragment (also known as the exclusion domain), which is retained in the mature enzyme, is separated from the catalytic domain by excision of a minor C-terminal part of the pro-region, called the activation peptide. A heavy chain of about 164 residues and a light chain of about 69 residues are generated by cleavage of the catalytic domain.

Unlike the other members of the papain family, mature cathepsin C consists of four subunits, each composed of the N-terminal proregion fragment, the heavy chain and the light chain. Both the pro-region fragment and the heavy chain are glycosylated.

Clinical significance 

Defects in the encoded protein have been shown to be a cause of Papillon-Lefevre disease, an autosomal recessive disorder characterized by palmoplantar keratosis and periodontitis.

Cathepsin C functions as a key enzyme in the activation of granule serine peptidases in inflammatory cells, such as elastase and cathepsin G in neutrophils cells and chymase and tryptase in mast cells. In many inflammatory diseases, such as rheumatoid arthritis, chronic obstructive pulmonary disease (COPD), inflammatory bowel disease, asthma,  sepsis, and cystic fibrosis, a significant portion of the pathogenesis is caused by increased activity of some of these inflammatory proteases. Once activated by cathepsin C, the proteases are capable of degrading various extracellular matrix components, which can lead to tissue damage and chronic inflammation.

References

Further reading

External links 
 The MEROPS online database for peptidases and their inhibitors: C01.070
 

Proteins
Proteases
EC 3.4.14
Cathepsins